The 1998 United States Senate election in Connecticut was held November 3, 1998 alongside other elections to the United States Senate in other states as well as elections to the United States House of Representatives and various state and local elections. Incumbent Democratic U.S. Senator Chris Dodd won re-election for a fourth term against former Republican U.S. Congressman Gary Franks.

Major candidates

Democratic 
 Chris Dodd, incumbent U.S. Senator

Republican 
 Gary Franks, former U.S. Representative

Results

See also 
 1998 United States Senate elections

References 

United States Senate
1998
Connecticut
Chris Dodd